Verónica Ampudia Niño de Rivera (born 31 July 1973) is a Mexican alpine skier who participated in the 1992 Winter Olympics in Albertville, France.

References

1973 births
Living people
Mexican female alpine skiers
Olympic alpine skiers of Mexico
Alpine skiers at the 1992 Winter Olympics